This article concerns the period 559 BC–550 BC.

Events and trends
Carthage conquers Sicily, Sardinia, and Corsica.
559 BC—King Cambyses I of Anshan dies and is succeeded by his son Cyrus II the Great.
558 BC—Hegesias is removed as Archon of Athens.
558 BC—The Chinese state of Jin defeats its rival state of Qin in battle.
557 BC—The Persians besiege Larissa (Calah) but fail to capture it until a solar eclipse occurs.
556 BC—Pisistratus is exiled from Athens to Euboea.
556 BC—Labashi-Marduk succeeds Neriglissar as king of Babylon.
556 BC—Nabonidus succeeds Labashi-Marduk as king of Babylon.
c. 550 BC—Colonisation of Greeks ends.
550 BC—Abdera is destroyed by the Thracians.
550 BC—Mago I begins his rule of Carthage.
550 BC—The Temple of Artemis is completed in Ephesus.
550 BC—Cyrus II the Great overthrows Astyages of the Medes, establishing the First Persian Empire.
c. 550 BC—The Temple of Hera I is built in what is now Paestum, Italy.
550 BC—Siddhartha Gautama founds Buddhism in Northern India after achieving enlightenment after six years of practicing penance and meditation.

Significant people
556 BC—Rule of Labashi-Marduk as king of Babylon
556 BC—Rule of Nabonidus as king of Babylon
558 BC—Death of Solon, Athenian statesman, poet.
c. 556 BC—Birth of Simonides of Ceos.
555 BC—Death of Stesichorus, Greek lyric poet.
September 28, 551 BC—Birth of Confucius, Chinese philosopher (traditional date).
c. 551 BC—Commonly accepted date of death of Zoroaster, founder of Zoroastrianism.
550 BC—Birth of Epicharmus, Greek poet (d. 460 BC).

References